Yonathan Levit (Hebrew: יונתן לויט; born 15 November 1997) is an Israeli badminton player. He won a silver medal at the 2017 Maccabiah Games.

Career 
Hailing from Binyamina, Levit started to playing badminton at the age of eight introduced by his parents. Both of his parents came from Russia. His first major title in Israel was the National U11 champion. He won the Hatzor International in the men's doubles event in 2016 and in the mixed doubles in 2017. In 2021, he trained in the Centre of Excellence based in Denmark toobtain his badminton career.

Achievements

BWF International Challenge/Series 
Men's doubles

Mixed doubles

  BWF International Challenge tournament
  BWF International Series tournament
  BWF Future Series tournament

References

External links 
 

1997 births
Living people
People from Binyamina-Giv'at Ada
Israeli people of Russian-Jewish descent
Israeli male badminton players
Competitors at the 2017 Maccabiah Games
Maccabiah Games silver medalists for Israel
Maccabiah Games medalists in badminton